Dzhemikent (Cəmikənd)  is a rural locality (a selo) in Derbentsky District, Republic of Dagestan, Russia. The population was 2,555 as of 2010. There are 27 streets.

Geography 
Dzhemikent is located 30 km northwest of Derbent (the district's administrative centre) by road. Druzhba and Berikey are the nearest rural localities.

Nationalities 
Azerbaijanis and Dargins live there.

References 

Rural localities in Derbentsky District